Kunów  is a town in Ostrowiec County, Świętokrzyskie Voivodeship, Poland, with 3,153 inhabitants (2004). Kunów was granted Magdeburg rights in 1365, stripped of them in 1867, to again become a town in 1990. It is located along the European route E371, and the town has a rail station on the Skarżysko-Kamienna – Sandomierz line.

In the early Middle Ages Kunów belonged to the Archbishops of Kraków, who had a manor house here. In 1241 the village was raided by the Mongols (see Mongol invasion of Poland), and in 1247 it was destroyed by the army of Prince Konrad Mazowiecki. The town belonged to Lesser Poland’s Sandomierz Voivodeship. In the 15th century powerful Cardinal Zbigniew Oleśnicki spent a lot of time in Kunów, which already had a wooden church of St. Władysław. In 1502 the town was completely burned by the Crimean Tatars, and as a result it temporarily lost its Magdeburg rights, regaining the privileges on August 29, 1535. In 1578 Kunów had 65 different artisans, and was famous for its white and red marble, used in construction of several palaces (such as the complex of Łazienki Park in Warsaw). By 1616 the town had 130 houses, a parish school and two churches, however after the catastrophic Swedish invasion of Poland (1655–1660), the number of houses was reduced to 63, with a population of 530.

After the wars of the 1650s, Kunów's importance declined. In 1705, 560 residents died in an epidemic, and in the late 18th century, after the Partitions of Poland, the town was annexed by the Habsburg Empire. In 1815–1915 it belonged to the Russian-controlled Congress Poland. Kunów burned in fires in 1814 and 1818, and in 1860 it had 145 houses with 1,121 inhabitants. During the January Uprising the town was one of centers of the rebellion, here leaders of Polish forces met to discuss their tactics. Kunów, however, lost its importance at the expense of the fast-growing industrial town of Ostrowiec Świętokrzyski, and was stripped of its town rights on June 1, 1869. In the Second Polish Republic Kunów belonged to Kielce Voivodeship, but it stagnated and remained a village. After World War II, Kunów began to develop. Waterworks, new school, library, health center, local government office and post office were opened. Among points of interest there is the parish church of St. Władysław (17th century), with a bell tower (1896). At a church cemetery there are tombs of January Uprising veterans.

External links

Kunów, official website

Cities and towns in Świętokrzyskie Voivodeship
Ostrowiec County
Sandomierz Voivodeship
Radom Governorate
Kielce Voivodeship (1919–1939)